Dahdah is an Arabic family name. People with the surname include:

 Abu Dahdah, Syrian-born Spaniard member of Al Qaeda
 Edward al-Dahdah (1898–1945), Lebanese journalist
 Lucien Dahdah (1929–2003), Lebanese academic and businessman
 Paul Dahdah (born 1941), bishop of the Apostolic Vicariate of Beirut

See also
 Abu Dahdah, alias of Imad Eddin Barakat Yarkas, Syrian-born Spaniard Al Qaeda member 
 House of al-Dahdah, Lebanese Maronite Christian family

Arabic-language surnames